Kelley Polar, born Michael Kelley, is an American musician, alternative dance vocalist and music producer. He is based in Sullivan, New Hampshire.

Career 
Originally a classical violist from Providence, Rhode Island, he studied at the Oberlin Conservatory and then at Juilliard, where he collaborated with Metro Area's Darshan Jesrani and Morgan Geist on tracks like "Miura", "The Art of Hot" and "Caught Up". He released a number of solo EPs under the alias of the Kelley Polar Quartet on Environ Records. His first album as Kelley Polar, Love Songs of the Hanging Gardens, was released in 2005 and contains elements of house, disco and pop. His follow-up I Need You To Hold On While The Sky Is Falling was released in March 2008 in the US and most of Europe. In 2012, Madonna sampled Polar's "Ashamed of Myself" in a medley, mixing it up with her own songs "Candy Shop" and "Erotica" in one of the most talked about sections of the MDNA Tour, giving Kelley Polar worldwide exposure.

He is the younger brother of Blevin Blectum. 

As Mike Kelley, he is the violist for the Apple Hill Chamber Players.

Discography

References

External links 

Official Site
Kelley Polar on Discogs.com
Kelley Polar Quartet on Discogs.com

Year of birth missing (living people)
Living people
American electronic musicians
Oberlin Conservatory of Music alumni
Juilliard School alumni